Iguerali is a village situated in the commune of Feraoun in the province of Bejaia, Algeria.

References

Populated places in Béjaïa Province